The following is a list of the municipalities (comuni) of Campania, Italy.

There are 550 municipalities in Campania (as of January 2019):

118 in the Province of Avellino
78 in the Province of Benevento
104 in the Province of Caserta
92 in the Metropolitan City of Naples
158 in the Province of Salerno

List

See also
List of municipalities of Italy

References

 
Geography of Campania
Campania